WRDD (1480 AM) is a commercial radio station licensed to serve Shippensburg, Pennsylvania. The station simulcasts a country music radio format with sister station WCAT-FM Carlisle, called "Red 102.3". It is owned by Shippenburg Broadcasting.

By day, WRDD transmits with 410 watts, but to avoid interference at night with other stations on 1480 AM, WRDD reduces power to only 9 watts at sunset. Programming is heard around the clock on FM translator W262DL at 100.3 MHz.

History

WSHP
Arthur Greiner founded the station, originally known as WSHP, in 1961. The name of the original licensee was Town Radio, Inc. Greiner served as the company's president and the station's general manager. Greiner operated the radio station until his death.

WSHP originally was a daytimer station with a power output of 500 watts. It remained a daytime-only station until it received nighttime power authorization in the late 1980s that allowed it to operate after sunset.

Sale to Allegheny Mountain Network
Cary Simpson's Allegheny Mountain Network group of station purchased the station in October 1996.  On April 28, 2000, the station changed its call letters to WEEO.

In 2008, due to major mechanical failure of the internal radiator element of the Valcom fiberglass antenna in use, the station constructed a 150-foot folded unipole designed by R. Morgan Burrow, Jr. P.E.  which yields a higher operating efficiency than the Valcom.

WRDD
On September 29, 2021, WEEO changed its format from a simulcast of classic country-formatted WIOO to a simulcast of country-formatted WCAT-FM 102.3 Carlisle under new WRDD call letters.

Translator
WRDD programming is broadcast on the following translator:

Previous logo

References

 1963 Broadcasting and Cable Yearbook
 1967 Broadcasting and Cable Yearbook
 1972 Broadcasting and Cable Yearbook
 1980 Broadcasting and Cable Yearbook
 1990 Broadcasting and Cable Yearbook
 1995 Broadcasting and Cable Yearbook
 1998 Broadcasting and Cable Yearbook
 2000 Broadcasting and Cable Yearbook

External links

FCC History Cards for WRDD

RDD
Country radio stations in the United States
Radio stations established in 1961
1961 establishments in Pennsylvania